Copernicia longiglossa is a palm which is endemic to eastern Cuba.

References

longiglossa
Trees of Cuba